Brendan Ryan may refer to:

 Brendan Ryan (Cork politician) (born 1946), Irish Independent (then Labour Party) Senator (1981–1993, 1997–2007)
 Brendan Ryan (baseball) (born 1982), U.S. major league baseball player
 Brendan Ryan (Dublin politician) (born 1953), Irish Labour Party Senator (2007–) from Dublin
 Brendan Ryan (footballer) (born 1964), former Australian rules footballer
 Brendan Ryan (poet) (born 1963), Australian poet
 J. Brendan Ryan, vice chairman of DraftFCB Worldwide